Campbellsville is a city in central Kentucky founded in 1817 by Andrew Campbell. It is known for Campbellsville University, Taylor Regional Hospital health care system, its historic downtown, and the proximity to Green River Lake State Park. Campbellsville is the county seat of Taylor County, with a geographic boundary shaped like a heart. Campbellsville celebrated its bicentennial on July 4, 2017.

History

Founding
The city was founded in 1817 and laid out by Andrew Campbell, who had moved from Augusta County, Virginia. Campbell owned a gristmill and a tavern and began selling lots in Campbellsville in 1814. Campbellsville was designated by the state legislature as the county seat in 1848 after Taylor County was separated from Green County. The city agreed to sell the public square to the county for one dollar so that a courthouse could be built.

Historic sites
Campbellsville has several historic sites as listed under Taylor County in the National Register of Historic Places listings in Kentucky.

The Campbellsville Historic Commercial District includes several blocks of Main Street. The historic First Street Brewery one street over dates back to the prohibition. Which is due to open in 2021 for the first time since the 1930s. The most notable structure in this district is Merchant Tower (formally Merchants Hotel) which has Romanesque architecture. It has been listed individually on the National Register of Historic Places since 1980.

The city's first courthouse was burned by Confederate cavalry in 1864 because the Union Army was using it for barracks. After the war, a second courthouse was built on the same site.  The third courthouse was built in 1965 on a property adjoining the "old courthouse" (on the aptly named Court Street). A fourth courthouse referred to as the Justice Center building was built on Main Street (along with a new adjoining county jail) in 2008. The project removed several old commercial buildings from the 300 block of East Main Street.

Geography

US 68, KY 55, KY 210, and KY 70 pass through Campbellsville.

Climate
The climate is characterized by hot, humid summers and generally mild to cool winters.  According to the Köppen climate classification system, Campbellsville has a humid subtropical climate, Cfa on climate maps.

Parks
Miller Park is the main recreational park with softball fields, tennis courts, swimming pool, playgrounds, walking track gardens, and open space.  It surrounds the Pitman Creek that flows through the park. About one mile to the west, Osborne Park (named after former Mayor Paul E. Osborne) is mostly open space and soccer fields. These two recreation parks are joined by the nature trail, the Pitman Creek Trail (a Trail Town project).

Demographics
The population within city limits was 10,604 at the 2010 U.S. census.

As of the census of 2010,  9,018 people, 3,764 households, and 2,160 families resided in the city. The 4,114 housing units averaged 817.9 per square mile (315.9/km). The racial makeup of the city was 89.11% White, 8.74% African American, 0.14% Native American 0.30% Asian, 0.04% Pacific Islander, 0.61% from other races, and 1.06% from two or more races. Hispanics or Latinos of any race were 1.17% of the population.

Of the 4,114 households, 27.5% had children under the age of 18 living with them, 44.5% were married couples living together, 16.0% had a female householder with no husband present, and 36.5% were not families. About 33.4% of all households were made up of individuals, and 16.5% had someone living alone who was 65 years of age or older. The average household size was 2.22 and the average family size was 2.80.

In the city, the population was distributed as  21.8% under the age of 18, 14.0% from 18 to 24, 23.9% from 25 to 44, 21.8% from 45 to 64, and 18.5% who were 65 years of age or older. The median age was 38 years. For every 100 females, there were 83.4 males. For every 100 females age 18 and over, there were 78.2 males.

The median income for a household in the city was $22,922, and for a family was $30,643. Males had a median income of $26,672 versus $19,736 for females. The per capita income for the city was $15,996. About 18.7% of families and 21.6% of the population were below the poverty line, including 37.6% of those under age 18 and 17.5% of those age 65 or over.

Economy

Present day
Campbellsville University (the local university), Taylor Regional Hospital (the regional health care system), and the Amazon fulfillment center are the top employers.

Campbellsville University (CU) published its 2016/2017 economic impact report showing an annual impact of $106,482,540.  Of that, $42.9 million impact the local economy.  The university's operations directly employ and support over 13.26% of all jobs in Taylor County, Kentucky.

Taylor Regional Hospital (TRH) - The expanding healthcare system serves the region of 110,000 people. TRH is one of the area's largest employers. In 2016, TRH served 98,900 patients.

Amazon's fulfillment center, known as SDF1, is located near the technology park.

Campbellsville is home to the Heartland Commerce and Technology Park (HCTP).  The park's initial tenant is an automotive components manufacturer, the INFAC Corporation.  In June 2017, HCTP received a "Build-Ready" certification to attract new companies.

Tourism is also part of the local economy because of nearby Green River Lake and Green River Lake State Park.

Historical
In the 20th century, Campbellsville was a regional center of industry (agriculture, lumber, textiles, milling, automotive, distribution, oil and gas, light manufacturing, education, healthcare, and tourism).

For decades, employment in the area was dominated by a large textile plant, formerly Union Underwear and since Fruit of the Loom. It closed in 1998.  Shortly thereafter, another notable employer closed, the Indiana-based Batesville Casket Company.

In 1969, the booming petroleum business was shut down because of environmental concerns of excess salt water disposal. In 2008, attempts failed to revitalize oil reserves because of water infiltration.

Legacy
The area is home to wood-milling companies that produce interior trim products (Cox Interior, Wholesale Hardwoods).

Campbellsville Industries (CI), "The Steeple People (tm)," is the oldest and largest steeple and tower manufacturer in the United States. CI has more than 15,000 installations located throughout the United States and Canada. CI claims the record for the world's largest prefabricated church steeple at 229 ft at the First Baptist Church in Huntsville, Alabama.

Campbellsville is home to the last Druther's (Burger Queen) restaurant in operation.

Media
Local print, radio, and TV:
 The local weekly newspaper, Central Kentucky News-Journal, has been published since 1910.
 WVLC 99.9 FM country music, Campbellsville
 WCKQ 104.1 FM Adult contemporary music, Campbellsville 
 WGRK 103.1 Country, Greensburg
 WTCO 1450 AM Rock, Campbellsville
 WLCU TV, Campbellsville University

Law and government
Campbellsville is a home rule-class city in and the county seat of Taylor County, Kentucky, United States.

The Campbellsville City Council is made up of twelve elected members.  During city council meetings held monthly, the mayor presides and all thirteen members have voting rights.

Education 
Campbellsville is home to Campbellsville University, founded in 1906 as an academy.

School districts with portions of Campbellsville include:
 Campbellsville Independent School District
 Taylor County School District

Campbellsville has two local public schools, Campbellsville High School and Taylor County High School, for each district.

Campbellsville has a lending library, the Taylor County Public Library.

Transportation
Public transportation is limited. RTEC provides public transit service that serves a 13-county area in southeast Kentucky.

Airports
Campbellsville does have a local airport, the Taylor County Airport (FAA Identifier: AAS). It is 2.5 miles from downtown Campbellsville.

Roadways
Campbellsville is accessible by two-lane roadways.  The closest four-lane roadway is the Bluegrass Parkway.

Notable people
Sandra Blanton, former member of the Indiana House of Representatives; raised in Campbellsville
Nancy Cox, 1990 Miss Kentucky; Lexington television reporter; born and raised in Campbellsville
Zack Cox, former Arkansas Razorback baseball player, Current professional baseball player
Clem Haskins, former college and professional basketball player and college basketball coach at University of Minnesota
J. B. Holmes, professional golfer
Russ Mobley, state representative from 2001 to 2009
Max Wise (born 1975), former FBI agent, serving as a member of the Kentucky Senate

Sister cities
Campbellsville is twinned with Buncrana in County Donegal, Republic of Ireland.

==References==

External links

 Chamber of Commerce

 
Cities in Kentucky
Cities in Taylor County, Kentucky
County seats in Kentucky
Populated places established in 1817
1817 establishments in Kentucky